Minerva is an unincorporated community in Mason County, Kentucky, United States.

History
A post office has been in operation at Minerva since 1810. Minerva was incorporated in 1844.

Notable person
 Stanley Forman Reed (1884-1980), Associate Justice of the Supreme Court of the United States

Notes

Unincorporated communities in Mason County, Kentucky
Unincorporated communities in Kentucky